Longyan Township is a township in Huanjiang Maonan Autonomous County, Guangxi, China.

Administrative division
As of 2021, the township is divided into one community and twelve villages: 
Longyan Community
Anshan
Dake
Jiule
Liangxing
Kenlan
Chaoge
Jiuwei
Chenghuang
Dadong
Huangzhong
Ganyan
Guangrong

History
The area belonged to Anhua Department during the Qing dynasty (1644–1911).

In 1933 during the Republic of China, Zhi'an Township was founded and was under the jurisdiction of Yibei County.

In 1951, Zhi'an Township and Chongxing Township were merged to form the 7th District. It was renamed Rocket People's Commune in 1958 and one year later renamed Longyan People's Commune. In 1962, its name was changed to Longyan District. It was incorporated as a township in 1984.

Geography
The township is situated at the northeastern of Huanjiang Maonan Autonomous County. It is surrounded by Congjiang County on the north, Xunle Miao Ethnic Township on the west, Rongshui Miao Autonomous County on the east, and the towns of Dongxing and Minglun on the south.

Economy
The economy of the township has a predominantly agricultural orientation, including farming and pig-breeding. Significant crops include rice and corn. Vegetables are the economic plants of this region.

Demographics

The 2019 census reported the township had a population of 23,309.

Tourist attractions
The Former Residence of Wei Jixing is a well known tourist spot in the township.

Transportation
The County Road X837 passes across the township north to south.

References

Bibliography

 

Divisions of Huanjiang Maonan Autonomous County